Brandon Thompkins (born October 9, 1987) is an arena football wide receiver who is currently a free agent.

After playing college football at Arkansas State University, Thompkins was signed as an undrafted free agent by the CFL's BC Lions, but cut after training camp. From there, he joined Spokane Shock. After two seasons, he was assigned to the Utah Blaze, only to go back to the Shock and be traded to the Philadelphia Soul on May 29, 2014 for future considerations. The Soul traded him to the Los Angeles Kiss on May 30, 2014, for future considerations.

On December 14, 2015, Thompkins was assigned to the Predators. With the Predators, he was named Placemaker of the Year in 2016. On February 1, 2017 he was assigned to the Cleveland Gladiators. On May 22, 2017, Thompkins was traded with Shane Boyd to the Baltimore Brigade for future considerations and claim order positioning. He earned Second Team All-Arena honors in 2017. On April 19, 2019, Thompson was assigned to the Brigade again.

References

External links
 Career Stats at arenafan.com

1987 births
American football wide receivers
Arkansas State Red Wolves football players
BC Lions players
Living people
Los Angeles Kiss players
Philadelphia Soul players
Spokane Shock players
Sportspeople from West Palm Beach, Florida
Utah Blaze players
Orlando Predators players
Cleveland Gladiators players
Baltimore Brigade players